The Sandbæk Report was a report authored by Ulla Sandbæk that after being passed by the European Parliament is now a European Union regulation titled Aid for Policies and Actions on Reproductive and Sexual Health and Rights in Developing Countries.

Anti-abortion groups and the Catholic Church claim that the report compels all European Union member states to fund overseas abortion services through their foreign aid budgets. They claim that the language of the report by talking of "universal access to a comprehensive range of safe and reliable reproductive and sexual health care and services" includes abortion under the World Health Organization definition, and that this was admitted by Ulla Sandbæk in a radio interview.

An amendment preventing the use of European Union aid to finance abortions was defeated. The increase in funding of 150% was contrasted to a 2.3% overall increase in the aid budget.

The policy was intended, in part, to replace some of the U.S. funding lost due to the Mexico City Policy, the U.S. policy under the George W. Bush administration which prohibited funding of abortion through foreign aid, particularly reversing the de-funding of the United Nations Population Fund. The European commissioner Poul Nielson said that the European Union wished to "fill the decency gap" left by the Mexico City policy.

References

2003 in the European Union
Abortion in Europe
History of international development
European Union law
Abortion law
European Union and the Catholic Church
United Nations Population Fund